The women's 78 kilograms (Half heavyweight) competition at the 2014 Asian Games in Incheon was held on 22 September at the Dowon Gymnasium.

Schedule
All times are Korea Standard Time (UTC+09:00)

Results

Main bracket

Repechage

References

External links
 
 Official website

W78
Judo at the Asian Games Women's Half Heavyweight
Asian W78